Lim Zoong-sun (a.k.a. Rim Jung Son; born 16 July 1943) is a North Korean football defender who played for North Korea in the 1966 FIFA World Cup. He also played for Moranbong Sports Team.

References

1943 births
North Korean footballers
North Korea international footballers
Association football defenders
Moranbong Sports Club players
1966 FIFA World Cup players
Living people